The Flight Stakes was an American Thoroughbred horse race first run in 1887 at Sheepshead Bay Race Track in Sheepshead Bay, Brooklyn, New York. A race for horses of either sex and of all ages, it was run on dirt over a distance of seven furlongs.

An annual event, the Flight Stakes was last run in September 1909 and was won by Jack Atkin. After the Republican controlled New York Legislature under Governor Charles Evans Hughes passed the Hart–Agnew anti-betting legislation on June 11, 1908 with penalties allowing for fines and up to a year in prison. The owners of Sheepshead Bay Race Track, and other racing facilities in New York State, struggled to stay in business without betting. Racetrack operators had no choice but to drastically reduce the purse money being paid out which by 1909 saw the Flight Stakes offering a purse that was as little as one-fifth of what it had been in earlier years. Further restrictive legislation was passed by the New York Legislature in 1910 which deepened the financial crisis for track operators and led to a complete shut down of racing across the state during 1911 and 1912. When a Court ruling saw racing return in 1913 it was too late for the Sheepshead Bay horse racing facility and it never reopened.

Records
Speed record: (at current distance of 1-1/16)
1:40.29 – Heatherten (1984) (new race and track record)

Most wins:
 2 – Kingston (1890, 1892)
 2 – Clifford (1894, 1896)
 2 – Hamburg Belle (1904, 1905)
 2 – Roseben (1906, 1907)

Most wins by a jockey:
 2 – Fred Littlefield (1889, 1898)
 2 – Fred Taral (1892, 1896)
 2 – Henry Griffin (1894, 1895)
 2 – Henry Spencer (1899, 1901)
 2 – Lucien Lyne (1904, 1906)

Most wins by a trainer:
 3 – A. Jack Joyner (1904, 1905, 1908)

Most wins by an owner:
 2 – Michael F. Dwyer (1890, 1892)
 2 – H. Eugene Leigh (1894, 1896)
 2 – William C. Whitney (1902, 1903)
 2 – Sydney Paget for J. B. A. Haggin (1904, 1905)

Winners

 † Hamburg Belle was always the property of James B. A. Haggin but as a convenience raced under the name of her manager, Sydney Paget.

References

Open mile category horse races
Discontinued horse races in New York City
Sheepshead Bay Race Track
Recurring sporting events established in 1887
Recurring sporting events disestablished in 1909